The 2006 North America 4 was the first tournament of its kind, a rugby union competition between four new North American teams. Each of the four teams face each other twice during the tournament, taking place in British Columbia, and then, in Columbus, Ohio. The tournament was won by Canada West who defeated the USA Falcons 31 points to 20 in the championship final.

Table

Results

May
 May 20 Canada East 14-29 USA Falcons
 May 20 Canada West 98-0 USA Hawks
 May 24 USA Hawks 33-22 USA Falcons
 May 24 Canada West 28-28 Canada East
 May 27 Canada East 34-11 USA Hawks
 May 27 Canada West 25-24 USA Falcons

July
 July 22 USA Falcons 25-24 Canada East
 July 22 USA Hawks 7-46 Canada West
 July 26 USA Falcons 45-17 USA Hawks
 July 26 Canada East 34-18 Canada West
 July 29 Consolation final - Canada East 34-18 USA Hawks
 July 29 Championship final - Canada West 31-20 USA Falcons

External links
Official website

2006
2006 rugby union tournaments for clubs
2006 in Canadian rugby union
2006 in American rugby union
2006 in North American rugby union